Daniel Tauvry (21 September 1669 – 18 March 1701) was a French physician.

1669 births
1701 deaths
17th-century French physicians
Members of the French Academy of Sciences